Skåne County or Region Skåne held a regional council election on 9 September 2018, on the same day as the general and municipal elections.

Results
The number of seats remained at 149 with the Social Democrats winning the most at 41, a drop of ten from 2014.

Municipalities

Images

References

Elections in Skåne County
Skåne